is a Japanese figure skater. She currently competes in both the singles and pairs disciplines. With her partner in pairs, Sumitada Moriguchi, she is the 2022 JGP Poland I bronze medalist and the 2022–23 Japan champion at both the senior and junior levels. As a single skater, she is the 2021–22 Japan Novice A bronze medalist.

Personal life 
Murakami was born on 30 July 2008 in Perth, Australia to a Chinese (Hong Kong) father and Japanese mother. She lived there for eight years and then moved to Japan to be coached by Mie Hamada.

Programs

With Moriguchi

Competitive highlights 
JGP: Junior Grand Prix

With Moriguchi for Japan

Women's singles

References

External links 
 

Japanese female pair skaters
Japanese female single skaters
Living people
2008 births
Sportspeople from Perth, Western Australia
Japanese people of Australian descent